Raspite is a mineral, a lead tungstate; with the formula PbWO4. It forms yellow to yellowish brown monoclinic crystals. It is the low temperature monoclinic dimorph of the tetragonal stolzite.

It was discovered in 1897 at Broken Hill, New South Wales, Australia, it was named for Charles Rasp (1846–1907), German-Australian prospector, discoverer of the Broken Hill ore deposit.

See also
List of minerals
List of minerals named after people

References

Bibliography
Palache, P.; Berman H.; Frondel, C. (1960). "Dana's System of Mineralogy, Volume II: Halides, Nitrates, Borates, Carbonates, Sulfates, Phosphates, Arsenates, Tungstates, Molybdates, Etc. (Seventh Edition)" John Wiley and Sons, Inc., New York, pp. 1089-1090.

Lead minerals
Tungstate minerals
Monoclinic minerals
Minerals in space group 14